Valère Regnault or Regnauld (1545–1623) was a French Jesuit theologian.

Life
He was born in the diocese of Besançon. He studied under Juan Maldonado at the Collège de Clermont, where he was one of the first pupils. He entered the Society of Jesus in 1573. He taught philosophy at the Collège de Bordeaux, then moral theology in several colleges.

Works
Praxis Fori Penitentialis
Compendaria praxis difficiliorum casuum conscientiae

References
Robert A. Maryks (2008) Saint Cicero and the Jesuits: The influence of the liberal arts on the adoption of moral probabilism. Google Books PDF Sample

Notes

External links
Jesuitica page

1545 births
1623 deaths
16th-century French Jesuits
17th-century French Jesuits
16th-century French Catholic theologians